Saint Paul and Apostle Paul usually refers to Paul the Apostle, the Christian religious leader.

People

Martyr saints
 Paul (d. ca. 362), Roman martyr, see John and Paul
 Paul (3rd century), one of a group of four martyrs, see Peter, Andrew, Paul, and Denise
 Paul, of Helladius, Crescentius, Paul and Dioscorides, a group of four martyrs killed in 326
 Paul and Ninety Companions (died 1240), Dominican martyrs
 Paul Chong Hasang of the Korean Martyrs (19th century)
 Paul Hanh, Paul Khoan Khan Pham, Paul Loc Van Le, Paul Tinh Boa Le, Paul Tong Buong, and Paul Duong of the Vietnamese Martyrs (18th and 19th centuries)

Other saints
 Paul of Narbonne (3rd century)
 Paul the Simple (d. ca. 339), Egyptian saint
 Paul of Narbonne (3rd century)
 Paul of Tammah (died 415), Egyptian saint
 Paul of Thebes (c. 220–341), Egyptian saint, regarded as the first Christian hermit
 Paul Aurelian (6th century), one of the seven founder saints of Brittany
 Paul I, (700-767), Pope
 Paul of Xeropotamou (9th century), founder of Agiou Pavlou monastery on Mount Athos in Greece
 Paul of Latrus (died c. 956), Greek hermit
 Paul VI, born Giovanni Battista Montini (1897-1978), Pope

People nicknamed Saint Paul
 Jean Baptiste Lolo (1798–?), often referred to as "St. Paul" or "Chief St. Paul", a fur trader, interpreter and First Nations chief in early British Columbia, Canada
 Paul Peterson (born 1964), sometimes known as "St. Paul", musician

Places

Antigua and Barbuda 
 Saint Paul Parish, Antigua and Barbuda

Australia 
 The Spot, New South Wales, a locality within the Sydney suburb of Randwick also known as St Pauls

Brazil 
 São Paulo, the capital of São Paulo state, and the country's largest city
 São Paulo (state) (SP)

Canada 
Alberta
 St. Paul, Alberta
 St. Paul (provincial electoral district), a former riding in Alberta
 Lac La Biche-St. Paul, the former riding which replaced it in 1993
 Lac La Biche-St. Paul-Two Hills, the current riding, which replaced it in 2012
 County of St. Paul No. 19, Alberta
Manitoba
 St. Paul (Manitoba electoral district), a riding in Manitoba
Newfoundland and Labrador
 St. Pauls, Newfoundland and Labrador
New Brunswick
 Saint-Paul, New Brunswick, often called Saint-Paul-de-Kent
 St. Paul, a former local service district in Gloucester County absorbed by the villages of Grande Anse, New Brunswick and Saint-Léolin, New Brunswick
 Saint-Paul Parish, New Brunswick
Nova Scotia
 St. Pauls, Nova Scotia
 St. Paul Island (Nova Scotia)
Ontario
 St. Paul's (electoral district), a riding in Toronto, Ontario
 St. Pauls Station, Ontario, a community in Perth South, Ontario
 Niagara Regional Road 81, known as Saint Paul Street in Saint Catharines, Ontario
Quebec
 Ville-Saint-Paul, part of a district in the borough Le Sud-Ouest in Montreal
 Rue Saint-Paul (Montreal) in Old Montreal
 Saint-Paul, Quebec
 Saint-Paul-d'Abbotsford, Quebec
 Saint-Paul-de-Montminy, Quebec
 Saint-Paul-de-l'Île-aux-Noix, Quebec
 Saint-Paul-de-la-Croix, Quebec
 Saint-Paulin, Quebec
 Nuns' Island, originally Île Saint-Paul, part of Montreal city, Canada

Dominica 
 Saint Paul Parish, Dominica

France 
 Saint-Paul, Alpes-Maritimes
 Saint-Paul, Corrèze
 Saint-Paul, Gironde
 Saint-Paul, Hautes-Pyrénées
 Saint-Paul, Haute-Vienne
 Saint-Paul, Oise
 Saint-Paul, Orne
 Saint-Paul, Savoie
 Saint-Paul, Vosges
 Saint-Paul, Réunion
 Saint-Paul-aux-Bois, in the Aisne département
 Saint-Paul-Cap-de-Joux, in the Tarn département
 Saint-Paul-de-Baïse, in the Gers département
 Saint-Paul-de-Fenouillet, in the Pyrénées-Orientales département
 Saint-Paul-de-Fourques, in the Eure département
 Saint-Paul-de-Jarrat, in the Ariège département
 Saint-Paul-de-Loubressac, in the Lot département
 Saint-Paul-de-Salers, in the Cantal département
 Saint-Paul-de-Serre, in the Dordogne département
 Saint-Paul-des-Landes, in the Cantal département
 Saint-Paul-d'Espis, in the Tarn-et-Garonne département
 Saint-Paul-de-Tartas, in the Haute-Loire département
 Saint-Paul-de-Varax, in the Ain département
 Saint-Paul-de-Varces, in the Isère département
 Saint-Paul-de-Vence, in the Alpes-Maritimes départment
 Saint-Paul-de-Vern, in the Lot département
 Saint-Paul-de-Vézelin, in the Loire département
 Saint-Paul-d'Izeaux, in the Isère département
 Saint-Paul-d'Oueil, in the Haute-Garonne département
 Saint-Paul-du-Bois, in the Maine-et-Loire département
 Saint-Paul-du-Vernay, in the Calvados département
 Saint-Paul-d'Uzore, in the Loire département
 Saint-Paul-en-Born, in the Landes département
 Saint-Paul-en-Chablais, in the Haute-Savoie département
 Saint-Paul-en-Cornillon, in the Loire département
 Saint-Paul-en-Forêt, in the Var département
 Saint-Paul-en-Gâtine, in the Deux-Sèvres département
 Saint-Paul-en-Jarez, in the Loire département
 Saint-Paul-en-Pareds, in the Vendée département
 Saint-Paul-et-Valmalle, in the Hérault département
 Saint-Paul-la-Coste, in the Gard département
 Saint-Paul-la-Roche, in the Dordogne département
 Saint-Paul-le-Froid, in the Lozère département
 Saint-Paul-le-Gaultier, in the Sarthe département
 Saint-Paul-le-Jeune, in the Ardèche département
 Saint-Paul-lès-Dax, in the Landes département
 Saint-Paul-lès-Durance, in the Bouches-du-Rhône département
 Saint-Paul-les-Fonts, in the Gard département
 Saint-Paul-lès-Monestier, in the Isère département
 Saint-Paul-lès-Romans, in the Drôme département
 Saint-Paul-Lizonne, in the Dordogne département
 Saint-Paul-Mont-Penit, in the Vendée département
 Saint-Paul-sur-Isère, in the Savoie département
 Saint-Paul-sur-Save, in the Haute-Garonne département
 Saint-Paul-sur-Ubaye, in the Alpes-de-Haute-Provence département
 Saint-Paul-Trois-Châteaux, in the Drôme département
 Île Saint-Paul, an island in the French Southern Territories

Germany 
 St. Pauli, a quarter of Hamburg, Germany

Liberia 
 Saint Paul River

Malta 
 St. Paul's Bay
 St. Paul's Hill
 San Pawl Milqi
 St Paul's Island

Saint Helena 
 Saint Paul's, Saint Helena, a district

Saint Kitts and Nevis 
 Saint Paul Capisterre, Saint Kitts
 Saint Paul Charlestown, Nevis
 Saint Paul Capesterre Village, Saint Kitts

Turkey
 Saint Paul Trail, a long-distance footpath in Turkey

United Kingdom 
 St Paul Malmesbury Without, a parish in Wiltshire
 St Pauls, Bristol, a district
 St. Pauls, Cheltenham
 St Paul's Cathedral, London

United States 
 St. Paul, Alaska (a city on Saint Paul Island, Alaska)
 St. Paul, Arkansas
 San Pablo, California
 Saint Paul, Illinois
 St. Paul, Iowa
 St. Paul, Indiana
 St. Paul, Kansas
 Saint Paul, Minnesota, the capital of the state of Minnesota
 St. Paul, Missouri
 St. Paul, Nebraska
 St. Pauls, North Carolina
 Saint Paul, Ohio
 St. Paul, Oregon
 St. Paul, Collin County, Texas
 St. Paul, San Patricio County, Texas
 St. Paul, Virginia

Brands and enterprises
 St. Paul Travelers, the product of a merger between the spun off subsidiary of Citigroup and St. Paul
 Saint-Paul Luxembourg, a media conglomerate in Luxembourg
 St Pauls, a British publishing company owned by the Society of Saint Paul

Buildings and institutions

Churches

Australia 

 St Paul's Cathedral, Melbourne
 St Paul's Church, Manuka

Canada 
 St. Paul The Apostle Maltese Church in Toronto
 St. Paul's, Bloor Street
 St. Paul's Basilica (Toronto)
 Trinity-St. Paul's United Church, Toronto
 St. Paul's Presbyterian Church, Glace Bay, Nova Scotia

Germany 
 Paulskirche, Frankfurt, a former church, now a hall in Frankfurt am Main

Greece 
 Agiou Pavlou monastery, named after St. Paul, on Mount Athos

Hong Kong 
 St. Paul's Church (Glenealy), at St. Paul's College, Hong Kong, Glenealy, Victoria City
 St. Paul's Mass Centre, a Catholic church in Hong Kong

Italy 
 Basilica of Saint Paul Outside the Walls, in Rome, traditional burial place of Paul the Apostle
 Saint Paul, Brugherio

Lebanon 
 The Armenian Apostolic Saint Paul Church, Anjar, Lebanon
 Convent of Saint Paul, Ehden
 Greek Catholic Basilica of Saint Paul in, Harissa, Lebanon

 Saint Peter & Saint Paul Church, Qornet Shehwan

Macau 
 Cathedral of Saint Paul in Macau

Malaysia 
 St. Paul's Church, Malacca

Malta 
 St Paul's Cathedral, Mdina
 Collegiate Parish Church of St Paul's Shipwreck

New Zealand 
 Old Saint Paul's, Wellington, a former church

Philippines 
 Saints Peter and Paul Church, Makati City, Metro Manila, Philippines

Portugal 
 Saint Paul Church in Braga

United Kingdom 
 St Paul's Cathedral in London, England, designed by Christopher Wren
 St Paul's Church, Knightsbridge, in Wilton Place
 St Paul's, Covent Garden in London, designed by Inigo Jones and also known as the Actors' Church
 Old St Paul's Cathedral, a cathedral in the City of London, destroyed in 1666 in a fire and replaced by Wren's cathedral
 Old Saint Paul's, Edinburgh, of the Scottish Episcopal Church
 St Paul's Tower, a residential tower in Sheffield
 St Paul's Church, Wordsworth Avenue in Sheffield
 St Paul, Frizington, Cumbria
 St Paul's, Harringay, London

United States 
 Cathedral of Saint Paul, National Shrine of the Apostle Paul in St. Paul, Minnesota
 Cathedral of Saint Paul in Birmingham in Birmingham, Alabama
 Cathedral of Saint Paul in Pittsburgh, Pennsylvania
 Cathedral of Saint Paul in Worcester in Worcester, Massachusetts
 Saint Paul Catholic Church (Ellicott City, Maryland)
 Saint Paul's Episcopal Church (Morganton, North Carolina)
 St. Paul Cathedral (Yakima, Washington)

 St. Paul Church (Over the Rhine) in Cincinnati, Ohio
 St. Paul's Episcopal Church (Georgetown, Delaware)
 St. Paul's Episcopal Church (Richmond, Virginia)
 St. Paul's Episcopal Church, Milwaukee, Wisconsin
 St. Paul's United Church of Christ of Laramie in Wyoming
 St. Paul's Episcopal Church, South Bass Island in Put-in-Bay, Ohio

Colleges, schools and universities

Australia 
 St Paul's Anglican Grammar School in Warragul, Victoria
 St Paul's College, Adelaide
 St. Paul's College, Melbourne
 St Paul's College, University of Sydney

 St Paul's School, Bald Hills in Brisbane

 St Paul's High School, Booragul in Lake Macquarie (New South Wales)

Canada 
 St. Paul's College (Manitoba), Winnipeg
 St. Paul's University College, University of Waterloo, Ontario
 St. Paul Secondary School, Mississauga, Ontario
 St. Paul Catholic High School (Niagara Falls, Ontario), a high school in Ontario
 Saint Paul University, Ottawa, Ontario
 St. Paul's High School (Winnipeg),Winnipeg, Manitoba
 St. Paul High School (Ottawa), Ontario

Hong Kong 
 St. Paul's Convent School
 St. Paul's Co-educational College
 St. Paul's College, Hong Kong
 St. Paul's Secondary School
 St. Paul's School (Lam Tin)

India 
 St Paul's High School, Hyderabad

 St. Paul's School, Belgaum in Camp
 St. Paul's School, Darjeeling

 St. Paul's College, Ranchi

 St. Paul's College, Agra

Ireland 

 St Paul's College, Raheny

Japan 
 St. Paul's University, an alternate name for Rikkyo University

Malaysia 
 St. Paul's Institution, Seremban, in Malaysia

New Zealand 
 St Paul's College, Auckland
 St Paul's Collegiate School, Hamilton

Philippines 
 St. Paul University System (7 campuses)

United Kingdom 
 St Paul's Catholic Comprehensive School and Performing Arts College, Leicester
 St Paul's Catholic School, Milton Keynes

 St. Paul's College, Sunbury-on-Thames
 St Paul's Girls' School, London
 St Paul's School, London

United States 

 St. Paul High School (Santa Fe Springs, California)
 St. Paul's School (Covington, Louisiana)
 St. Paul's School (Brooklandville, Maryland), near Baltimore
 St. Paul's School for Girls (Maryland), Brooklandville, Maryland 
 Saint Paul College, Saint Paul, Minnesota
 St. Paul Academy and Summit School, Saint Paul, Minnesota
 St. Paul's College in St. Paul Park, Minnesota
 St. Paul's School (Concord, New Hampshire)
 St. Paul's School (Garden City, New York)
 Saint Paul's College, Virginia
 St. Paul's College, Washington, D.C.

Other countries 
 St. Paul's College, Namibia
 St Paul's School, Brazil

Hospitals

Stadiums 
 Stadio San Paolo, football stadium in Naples, Italy

Paintings
 Saint Paul (El Greco), c. 1610–1614
 Saint Paul (Masaccio), a panel of Masaccio's Pisa Altarpiece, 1426
 Saint Paul (Velázquez), c. 1619

Sports
 St Paul's Camogie Club, a former women's sport club in Kilkenny City, Ireland
 FC St. Pauli, a German sports club

Transportation
 Saint Pauli, a New Zealand Company chartered sailing ship that bought German settlers to Nelson
 St Paul's tube station, a station on the Central Line of the London Underground
 Saint-Paul (Paris Métro), a station on the Paris Métro Line 1

Other uses
 St. Paul (oratorio), an oratorio by Felix Mendelssohn
 St. Paul sandwich, a Chinese-American sandwich from St. Louis, Missouri
 USS Saint Paul, any of four United States Navy vessels

See also 
 Paul (disambiguation)
 St Paul Island (disambiguation)
 St. Pauli Girl, a German beer
 San Pablo (disambiguation)
 San Paolo (disambiguation)
 Sant Pau (disambiguation)
 São Paulo (disambiguation)
 St Paul's Creative Centre, headquarters for various organisations in Adelaide, South Australia
 Vincent de Paul (saint)